Troy Ryan (born October 25, 1986), better known by his stage name DJ Webstar (or simply Webstar) is an American DJ and record producer. In 2006, his song "Chicken Noodle Soup", became popular and became an Internet meme, with fans uploading amateur videos dancing to the track. The song's popularity led to him being signed by the now defunct Universal Records.

Discography

Albums

Singles

Guest appearances

References

External links
Baller Status News about DJ Webstar and Chicken Noodle Soup
BET News on DJ Webstar
Webstar
Webstar "Chicken Noodle Soup" Music Video on Gotuit Music

1986 births
Living people
American hip hop DJs
East Coast hip hop musicians
African-American male rappers
People from Harlem
Rappers from Manhattan
African-American record producers
American hip hop record producers
Record producers from New York (state)
SRC Records artists
21st-century American rappers
21st-century American male musicians
21st-century African-American musicians
20th-century African-American people